Tower Hamlets was a parliamentary borough (constituency) in Middlesex, England from 1832 to 1885. It elected two Members of Parliament (MPs) to the House of Commons of the Parliament of the United Kingdom. It was one of the first five of its type in the metropolitan area of London. It was enfranchised by the Reform Act 1832.

In its early years the borough was coterminous with the ancient Tower Hamlets, an area which covered the area of the modern London Borough of Tower Hamlets as well as Shoreditch and Hackney (the parish rather than the larger modern borough), thus extending from the edge of the City of London to the Lea. In 1868, the borough was split in two, with the southern part retaining the name.

Boundaries

Boundaries 1832–1868
The boundaries of the parliamentary borough were defined by the Parliamentary Boundaries Act 1832 as "The several Divisions of the Liberty of the Tower, and the Tower Division of Ossulston Hundred".

It comprised the following civil parishes and places:

Bethnal Green
Bow
Bromley
Hackney
Limehouse
Poplar
St Botolph Without Aldgate

St George in the East
Shoreditch
Spitalfields
Tower of London
Old Tower Without
Wapping
Whitechapel (part)

Boundaries 1868–1885
The Representation of the People Act 1867 widened the parliamentary franchise and also effected a redistribution of seats. This, along with a rapidly increasing population in the East End, resulted in the existing entity being reduced, shedding the parishes of Bethnal Green, Hackney and Shoreditch forming a separate Hackney constituency. The reformed Tower Hamlets was defined as comprising:
The Parish of St. George's-in-the-East
The Hamlet of Mile End Old Town
The Poplar Union (Bow, Bromley and Poplar)
The Stepney Union (Limehouse, Ratcliffe, Shadwell and Wapping)
The Whitechapel Union (Holy Trinity Minories, Mile End New Town, Norton Folgate, Old Artillery Ground, St Botolph Without Aldgate, St Katherine by the Tower, Spitalfields, Whitechapel.)
The Tower of London.

Redistribution
In 1885 the parliamentary borough was split into seven single-member divisions. These were Bow and Bromley, Limehouse, Mile End, Poplar, St George, Stepney and Whitechapel.

Members of Parliament

Elections
Turnout, in multi-member elections, is estimated by dividing the number of votes by two. To the extent that electors did not use both their votes, the figure given will be an underestimate.

Change is calculated for individual candidates, when a party had more than one candidate in an election or the previous one. When a party had only one candidate in an election and the previous one change is calculated for the party vote.

Elections in the 1830s

 

 
 

 
 

Lushington was appointed a judge of the High Court of Admiralty, requiring a by-election.

Elections in the 1840s

 
 
 

Fox was appointed Surveyor-General of the Ordnance, requiring a by-election.

Elections in the 1850s

Elections in the 1860s

 
 

Ayrton was appointed First Commissioner of Works and Public Buildings, requiring a by-election.

Elections in the 1870s

Elections in the 1880s

References

Sources 
 Boundaries of Parliamentary Constituencies 1885-1972, compiled and edited by F.W.S. Craig (Parliamentary Reference Publications 1972)
 British Parliamentary Election Results 1832-1885, compiled and edited by F.W.S. Craig (Macmillan Press 1977)
 Who's Who of British Members of Parliament: Volume I 1832-1885, edited by M. Stenton (The Harvester Press 1976)
 Who's Who of British Members of Parliament, Volume II 1886-1918, edited by M. Stenton and S. Lees (Harvester Press 1978)

Politics of the London Borough of Tower Hamlets
Parliamentary constituencies in London (historic)
Constituencies of the Parliament of the United Kingdom disestablished in 1885
Constituencies of the Parliament of the United Kingdom established in 1832